Phil Parsons (born November 8, 1968) is an American anime voice actor who works at Funimation. He is known for voicing Nappa in the Funimation dub of the Dragon Ball series, Kenny Ackerman in Attack on Titan,  Renji Yomo in Tokyo Ghoul, Leonard Burns in Fire Force and Buccaneer in Fullmetal Alchemist: Brotherhood.

Dubbing roles

Anime
 A Certain Magical Index III – Chimitsu Sunazara, Bellagi (ep18)
 Attack on Titan – Kenny Ackerman
 Baccano! – Berga Gandor
 Baki the Grappler – Kajima
 Black Clover - Roland
 Blood Blockade Battlefront – Klaus V. Reinherz
 Burst Angel – Tetsuzo
 Case Closed (FUNimation dub) – Cramden Yodlemiere, Xaltar, Kevin
 Chaos;Child – Wataru Sakuma
 Chrome Shelled Regios – Zidd
 Castle Town Dandelion - Souichirou Sakurada  
 Darker than Black – Ukiyama
 Date A Live III - Roger Murdoch
 Dimension W – Douglas Marks (Eps. 7, 9–10, 12)
 Dragon Ball - Mutaito
 Dragon Ball Z – Nappa, Grand Supreme Kai
 Dragon Ball Z Kai - Nappa, Grand Supreme Kai
 Dragon Ball Super - Nappa, Sun, Bubibinman
 Dragon Ball Super: Broly - Nappa, Male Saiyan Staff A, Male Saiyan Courtier A
 Endride – King Delzaine
 Eureka Seven: AO – Mitsuo Arata (Naru's Father)
 Fairy Tail – Older Vanish Brother, (Eps. 3–4, 129) Belserion (Eps. 312)
 Fire Force – Leonard Burns
 Fullmetal Alchemist series – Gen. Hakuro, Buccaneer
 Ga-Rei: Zero – Koji Iwahata
 Gunslinger Girl: Il Teatrino – Leonardo Conti
 High School DxD – Azazel (Seasons 2–4)
 Kiddy Grade – Noble Bishop
 Last Exile: Fam, the Silver Wing – Roland (Ep. 7, 9.5), Yashbal Anad (Ep. 6)
 Lupin the 3rd: The Pursuit of Harimao's Treasure – Sir Archer
My Hero Academia – Tensei Iida
 Noragami: Aragoto – Kugaha
 One Piece – Zaba, Phillip, Jesus Burgess, Capote, Jabra
 Overlord – Nigun Grid Luin
 Phantom ~Requiem for the Phantom – Daisuke 
 Rebuild of Evangelion – Shigeru Aoba
 Rumbling Hearts – Mr. Suzumiya
 Senran Kagura – Dogen
 Shakugan no Shana – Ribesal (Season 3)
 Shangri-La – Nemoto
 Shiki – Yoshikazu Tanaka (1st voice), Hirosawa
 SoltyRei – John Kimberly (Ep. 8)
 Soul Eater – Flying Dutchman
 Speed Grapher – Fukushima
 Tokyo Ghoul series – Renji Yomo
 Toriko – Bourbo
 Trinity Blood – Leon Garcia De Asturias
 Vexille – Saga

Filmography

Video games
Borderlands: The Pre-Sequel! – Lost Legion Infantry #1
Battleborn – Caldarius
 Dragon Ball Z: Budokai - Nappa
 Dragon Ball Z: Budokai 2 - Nappa
 Dragon Ball Z: Budokai 3 - Nappa
 Dragon Ball Z: Sagas - Nappa
 Dragon Ball Z: Budokai Tenkaichi - Nappa
 Dragon Ball Z: Budokai Tenkaichi 2 - Nappa
 Dragon Ball Z: Budokai Tenkaichi 3 - Nappa
 Dragon Ball Z: Burst Limit - Nappa
 Dragon Ball Z: Infinite World - Nappa
 Dragon Ball: Raging Blast - Nappa
 Dragon Ball Z: Tenkaichi Tag Team - Nappa
 Dragon Ball: Raging Blast 2 - Nappa
 Dragon Ball Z: Ultimate Tenkaichi - Nappa
 Dragon Ball Z: For Kinect - Nappa
 Dragon Ball Z: Battle of Z - Nappa
 Dragon Ball Xenoverse - Nappa
 Dragon Ball Xenoverse 2 - Nappa
 Dragon Ball FighterZ - Nappa
 Dragon Ball Legends - Nappa
 Dragon Ball Z: Kakarot - Nappa
Smite – Apollo, Chiron

References

External links
 
 

1968 births
Living people
American male voice actors
Place of birth missing (living people)